Maxim Volkov (born 16 January 1985, in Karaganda) is a Kazakhstani professional ice hockey player currently playing for Arystan Temirtau in the Kazakhstan Hockey Championship league.

References

External links

Kazakhstani ice hockey forwards
Arystan Temirtau players
Sportspeople from Karaganda
1985 births
Living people
Asian Games gold medalists for Kazakhstan
Medalists at the 2017 Asian Winter Games
Asian Games medalists in ice hockey
Ice hockey players at the 2017 Asian Winter Games